Thank You, I'm Fine is a 1948 German comedy film directed by Erich Waschneck and starring Ernst von Klipstein, Karin Hardt, and Sonja Ziemann. It is also known by the title A Lovely Family.

It was produced towards the end of the Second World War by the independent company Berlin Film. Left unfinished, it was finally completed by the Communist-controlled DEFA studio in the Soviet Zone and put on general release across Germany. It was one of a number of films of the Nazi era that had delayed releases in the years after the fall of the regime.

The film's sets were designed by the art directors Heinrich Beisenherz and Alfred Bütow.

Synopsis
After their father's death his seven sons and daughters try to scare off any prospective tenants from taking over the large house.

Cast

See also
 Überläufer

References

Bibliography

External links 
 

1948 films
1948 comedy films
German comedy films
East German films
West German films
1940s German-language films
Films directed by Erich Waschneck
German black-and-white films
1940s German films